James L. Cumberland (born October 26, 1933) is a former Republican member of the Pennsylvania House of Representatives.
 He was born in Butler.

References

Republican Party members of the Pennsylvania House of Representatives
Living people
1933 births